A partial solar eclipse occurred on October 12, 1996. A solar eclipse occurs when the Moon passes between Earth and the Sun, thereby totally or partly obscuring the image of the Sun for a viewer on Earth. A partial solar eclipse occurs in the polar regions of the Earth when the center of the Moon's shadow misses the Earth.

Images

Related eclipses

Eclipses of 1996 
 A total lunar eclipse on April 4.
 A partial solar eclipse on April 17.
 A total lunar eclipse on September 27.
 A partial solar eclipse on October 12.

Solar eclipses 1993–1996

Metonic series

References

1996 10 12
1996 in science
1996 10 12
October 1996 events